Jerald Walker is an American writer and professor of creative writing and African American literature at Emerson College.

Early life and education
Walker was born in Chicago, he received his MFA in Fiction Writing from the Iowa Writer's Workshop, as well as a Ph.D. in Interdisciplinary Studies from the University of Iowa.

Career
Walker's essays have appeared in magazines such as The Harvard Review, The Oxford American, Creative Nonfiction, The New England Review, and Mother Jones, and they have been widely anthologized, including five times in The Best American Essays (2020, 2014, 2011, 2009) and twice in The Best African American Essays (2009, 2010). He has written book reviews for The New York Times and The Washington Post.

His first book, Street Shadows: A Memoir of Race, Rebellion and Redemption, was awarded the L.L. Winship/PEN New England Award for Nonfiction. How to Make a Slave and Other Essays, his third book, was a Finalist for the National Book Award in Nonfiction. He is also the recipient of a Guggenheim Fellowship (2022) a National Endowment for the Arts Fellowship (2018), the Massachusetts Book Award for Nonfiction (2021), a Pushcart Prize (2021), a James A. Michener Fellowship. and a Massachusetts Cultural Council of the Arts Fellowship.

Prior to joining Emerson College, Walker was an associate professor of American Literature at Bridgewater State University. In addition to teaching at the Fine Arts Work Center in Provincetown, MA, he has been the Ida Bean Distinguished Visiting Writer in the Nonfiction Program at the University of Iowa and the Visiting Hurst Professor at Washington University.

Works

Books
 2020: How to Make a Slave and Other Essays, Mad Creek, 
 2017: The World in Flames: A Black Boyhood in a White Supremacist Doomsday Cult, Beacon Press, 
 2010: Street Shadows: A Memoir of Race, Rebellion and Redemption,

Anthologies
 "Breathe". The Best American Essays 2020. Guest Editor, Andre Anciman.
 "How to Make a Slave". The Best American Essays 2014. Guest Editor, John Jeremiah Sullivan.
 "Unprepared". The Best American Essays 2011. Guest Editor, Edwidge Danticat.
 "The Mechanics of Being". The Best American Essays 2009. Guest Editor, Mary Oliver.
 "Dragon Slayers". The Best American Essays 2007. Guest Editor, David Foster Wallace.
 "Before Grief". The Best African American Essays 2010. Guest Editor, Randall Kennedy.
 "We Are Americans". The Best African American Essays 2009. Guest Editor, Debra Dickerson.
 "The Kaleshion". The Pushcart Prizes XLV. Editor, Bill Henderson.

Awards and Honors
 2022: Guggenheim Fellowship
 2021: Massachusetts Book Award for Nonfiction
 2021: Pushcart Prize
 2021: Best Boston Author by Boston Magazine
 2021: National Book Award for Nonfiction Finalist
 2018: National Endowment for the Arts Fellowship
 2011: PEN New England Award for Nonfiction
 1995: James A. Michener Fellowship

References 

Living people
University of Iowa alumni
National Endowment for the Arts Fellows
Emerson College faculty
Year of birth missing (living people)